Elyasi-ye Khalifeh Hoseyn (also Romanized as Elyāsī-ye Khalīfeh Ḩoseyn; also known as Elyās-e Khalīfeh Ḩasan) is a village in Dasht-e Zahab Rural District, in the Central District of Sarpol-e Zahab County, Kermanshah Province, Iran. At the 2006 census, its population was 170, in 34 families.

References 

Populated places in Sarpol-e Zahab County